Ascend may refer to:

 Ascend (Greg Howe album), 1999
 Ascend (Nine Lashes album), 2016
 Ascend (Illenium album), 2019
 ASCEND, mathematical modelling/simulation software 
 Ascend Communications, an Alameda, California-based manufacturer of communications equipment
 Ascend: Hand of Kul, an Xbox 360 and PC game by Signal Studios
 Huawei Ascend, a series of Android operating system-based smartphones manufactured by Huawei
 Ascend Group, a e-commerce company headquartered in Bangkok, Thailand

See also
 Ascent (disambiguation)
 Ascension (disambiguation)
 Ascender (disambiguation)
 Ascendency in ecology
 Ascendant, in astrology
 Ascendancy (disambiguation)